The 2014 Polish Speedway season was the 2014 season of motorcycle speedway in Poland.

Individual

Polish Individual Speedway Championship
The 2014 Individual Speedway Polish Championship final was held on 14 August at Zielona Góra. Krzysztof Kasprzak won the Polish Championship.

Golden Helmet
The 2014 Golden Golden Helmet organised by the Polish Motor Union (PZM) was the 2014 event for the league's leading riders. The final was held at Rawicz on the 12 October. Przemysław Pawlicki won the Golden Helmet for the first time. His brother Piotr had won it two years earlier in 2012.

Junior Championship
 winner - Szymon Wozniak

Silver Helmet
 winner - Piotr Pawlicki Jr.

Bronze Helmet
 winner - Adrian Cyfer

Pairs

Polish Pairs Speedway Championship
The 2014 Polish Pairs Speedway Championship was the 2014 edition of the Polish Pairs Speedway Championship. The final was held on 19 October at Gorzów Wielkopolski.

Team

Team Speedway Polish Championship
The 2014 Team Speedway Polish Championship was the 2014 edition of the Team Polish Championship. Stal Gorzów Wielkopolski won the gold medal. The team included Krzysztof Kasprzak, Niels Kristian Iversen and Bartosz Zmarzlik.

Ekstraliga

Play offs

1.Liga

Play offs

2.Liga

Play offs

References

Poland Individual
Poland Team
Speedway